is a Japanese manga series written by Shigemitsu Harada and illustrated by Kyūjo Matsumoto. It was published in Hakusensha's seinen manga magazine Young Animal Arashi from November 2013 to June 2014; a second series, Motoyome: Onna Shachō-hen, was serialized in the same magazine from May to December 2015; a third series, Motoyome: Elite Joi-hen, was serialized from February to September 2016; a fourth series, Motoyome: Joryū Kadōka-hen, was serialized from January to August 2017. The four series as a whole were collected in four tankōbon volumes.

Publication
Its chapters were collected in a single tankōbon volume, released on August 29, 2014. A second series, was serialized in the same magazine from May 1 to December 4, 2015. Its chapters were collected in a single tankōbon, released on February 29, 2016. A third series, was serialized from February 5 to September 2, 2016. Its chapters were collected in a single tankōbon, released on November 29, 2016. A fourth series, was serialized from January 6 to August 4, 2017. Its chapters were collected in a single tankōbon, released on October 27, 2017.

Volume list

See also
Cells at Work! Code Black—another manga series by the same writer
Ippatsu Kiki Musume—another manga series by the same writer
Majo wa Mioji Kara—another manga series by the same authors
Megami no Sprinter—another manga series by the same writer
Yuria 100 Shiki—another manga series by the same writer

References

External links
 
 

Hakusensha manga
Seinen manga
Sex comedy anime and manga